In molecular biology mir-3180 microRNA is a short RNA molecule. MicroRNAs function to regulate the expression levels of other genes by several mechanisms. The mir-10 microRNA precursor is a short non-coding RNA gene that is part of an RNA gene family which contains mir-3180-1, mir-3180-2, mir-3180-3, mir-3180-4 and mir-3180-5.  They have now been predicted or experimentally confirmed in a wide range of cancers in humans. (MIPF0000894, mir-3180) mir-3180 has currently only been identified in human Homo sapiens.

Species distribution 
The presence of mir-3180 has been detected in a range of catarrhine monkeys. It has been identified in primates including human (Homo sapiens), Sumatran orangutan (Pongo abelii), western lowland gorilla (Gorilla gorilla gorilla), Northern white-cheeked gibbon (Nomascus leucogenys), Chlorocebus sabaeus (Chlorocebus sabaeus), Olive baboon (Papio anubis) and Rhesus monkey (Macaca mulatta). In some of these species the presence of mir-3180 has been shown experimentally, in others the genes encoding mir-3180 might have been predicted computationally.

Genomic location 
The mir-3180 genes are found within the Chromosome 16. In humans there are five mir-3180 clusters, these contain five genes encoding miRNAs (mir-3180-1, mir-3180-2, mir-3180-3, mir-3180-4 and mir-3180-5). The mir-3180 genes have the following locations:

hsa-mir-3180-1	chr16
Start: 14911220
End: 14911313
Strand: +

hsa-mir-3180-2	chr16
Start: 16309879
End: 16309966
Strand: +

hsa-mir-3180-3	chr16
Start: 18402178
End: 18402271
Strand: -

hsa-mir-3180-4	chr16
Start: 15154850
End: 15155002
Strand: -

hsa-mir-3180-5	chr16
Start: 2135977
End: 2136129
Strand: -

Association with cancer 
Recently there has been much interest in abnormal levels of expression of microRNAs in cancers. Upregulation of mir-3180 has been found in cancers. Increased levels of mir-3180 have been found in colon cancer.

See also 
 MicroRNA

Further reading

External links 
 

MicroRNA
MicroRNA precursor families